The Wedding Banquet is a 1993 romantic comedy film directed, produced and co-written by Ang Lee. The story concerns a gay Taiwanese immigrant man (played by Winston Chao, in his film debut) who marries a mainland Chinese woman (May Chin) to placate his parents (Gua Ah-leh and Lung Sihung) and get her a green card. His plan backfires when his parents arrive in the United States to plan his wedding banquet and he has to hide the truth of his gay partner (Mitchell Lichtenstein). It was a co-production of Lee's Good Machine production company, and the Taiwanese Central Motion Picture Corporation.

Lee’s second feature film and his first to get a theatrical release in the United States, The Wedding Banquet premiered at the 43rd Berlin International Film Festival, where it won the Golden Bear. It was both a critical and commercial success, becoming the most profitable film of 1993 and won five Golden Horse Awards, including Best Film and Best Director. It received Oscar and Golden Globe nominations for Best Foreign-Language Film, as well as six Independent Spirit Award nominations.

Together with Pushing Hands (1991) and Eat Drink Man Woman (1994), all showing the Confucian family at risk, and all starring the Taiwanese actor Lung Sihung, The Wedding Banquet forms what has been called Lee's "Father Knows Best" trilogy.

Plot
Gao Wai-Tung is a gay Taiwanese immigrant in Manhattan, happily living with his partner Simon. He has not come out to his traditionally-minded parents who live back in Taiwan, and as he’s in his late-20s, they’ve become eager to see him get married and have a child in order to continue the family line. When his parents hire a dating service, Wai-Tung and Simon stall for time by inventing numerous impossible demands. They demand an opera singer and add that she must be 5'9", have two PhDs, and speak five languages. To their shock, the service actually locates a 5'8" Chinese woman who meets all but one of their qualifiers (having only a single PhD instead of two). She is very gracious when Wai-Tung explains his dilemma, as she too is hiding a relationship (with a white man).

At Simon's insistence, Wai-Tung decides to marry one of his tenants, Wei-Wei, a penniless artist from mainland China in need of a green card. Besides helping Wei-Wei, the couple hope that this will placate Wai-Tung's parents. To complicate matters, Mr. and Mrs. Gao announce they will visit. Before the parents arrive, Simon tells Wei-Wei everything she needs to know about Wai-Tung's habits, body, and lifestyle; and the three hastily take down all gay-related content from their house and replace it with traditional Chinese scrolls.

Mr. and Mrs. Gao arrive bringing gifts and US$30,000 to hold an extravagant wedding for their son; believing he is involved with a wealthy woman. Wai-Tung dares not tell his parents the truth, because his father (a retired army officer) has just recovered from a stroke. As a part of the lie, Wai-Tung introduces Simon as his landlord. 

A day after his parents arrive, Wai-Tung announces that he and Wei-Wei plan to get their marriage certificate at city hall. However, the heartbreak his mother experiences at the courthouse wedding (both at the arrangement and at the discovery of her son's relation with an underclass woman) prepares the story for a shift to drama. The only way to atone for the ‘disgraceful’ wedding is a magnificent wedding banquet, offered by Mr. Gao's former batman, who now owns a restaurant and reception hall. After the banquet, several relatives come up to their hotel room for an unsolicited after-party and they demand that the newlyweds get in bed naked before they all leave. This leads to a drunken tryst between the unwilling couple that ends in Wei-Wei’s pregnancy. Simon is extremely upset when he finds out and his relationship with Wai-Tung begins to deteriorate.

Shortly after, Mr. Gao suffers another stroke, and in a moment of anger, after a fight with both Simon and Wei-Wei, Wai-Tung admits the truth to his mother. She is shocked and insists that he not tell his father. However, the perceptive Mr. Gao has seen more than he is letting on; he secretly tells Simon that he knows about their relationships and, appreciating the considerable sacrifices he made for his biological son, takes Simon as his son as well. Simon accepts the hongbao from Wai-Tung's father, a symbolic admission of their relationship. Mr. Gao seeks and receives Simon's promise not to tell his secret for (as he points out) without the sham marriage, he'd never have a grandchild.

While en route to an appointment for an abortion, Wei-Wei decides to keep the baby, and asks Simon to stay together with Wai-Tung and be the baby's second father. 

In the final parting scene, as Wai-Tung's parents prepare to fly home, Mrs. Gao has forged an emotional bond to daughter-in-law Wei-Wei. Mr. Gao accepts Simon and warmly shakes his hand. In the end, both derive some happiness from the situation, and they walk off to board the aircraft, leaving the unconventional family to figure themselves out.

Cast

Analysis 
Elisabetta Marino, author of "When East Meets West: A Sweet and Sour Encounter in Ang Lee's The Wedding Banquet", wrote that the film suggests that there can be a reconciliation between Eastern and western cultures, unlike Amy Tan's novels where the cultural differences are portrayed as irreconcilable.

About 60% of the film is in Mandarin Chinese. Elisabetta Marino, author of "When East Meets West: A Sweet and Sour Encounter in Ang Lee's The Wedding Banquet", wrote that "after striving to read the subtitles for the first ten or fifteen minutes, one finds oneself so completely absorbed in the flow of the story, in the tones of the several voices, in the gestures and the facial expressions of the actors, that one simply forgets to read and reaches an understanding beyond languages, beyond words, following a plot and, most of all, a set of characters who do not conform to the stereotypical portrayals an American audience would expect." Marino argued that "Lee’s creative process and his final choice of two languages, Mandarin Chinese and English, for the movie are in themselves symptomatic of his wish to reach a peaceful coexistence between apparently irreconcilable cultures, without conferring the leading role on either of them."

Production

Development and writing 
Neil Peng approached director Ang Lee with the idea behind The Wedding Banquet in 1986 by revealing to Lee that one of their mutual friends had moved to the United States and was in a same-sex relationship without the knowledge of the man's parents. Lee and Peng began writing the screenplay two years later and were soon joined by James Schamus. In the published screenplay version of the film, Schamus wrote that the film was "first drafted in Chinese, then translated into English, re-written in English, translated back into Chinese, and eventually subtitled in Chinese and English and a dozen other languages." The script won a Taiwan state film competition in 1990.

Casting 
The Wedding Banquet was the debut film of Winston Chao, whom Ang Lee met on an airline where he was working as a flight attendant. Chao, who had no formal acting training, was reticent to take the part, until Lee agreed to coach him with an acting instructor of his choosing. Chao spent three-to-four hours each day before and during filming in in-depth rehearsals.

Filming 
Filming took place entirely on-location in New York City. To keep the budget low, the production utilized free or public locations, including JFK International Airport, the Mayor's Office of Film, Theatre & Broadcasting, Socrates Sculpture Park in Queens, NewYork-Presbyterian Lower Manhattan Hospital, and cast and crew members’ homes. The titular banquet scene was shot in the ballroom of a Sheraton Hotel near LaGuardia Airport.

Reception 
The Wedding Banquet received mostly positive reviews; on the review aggregator Rotten Tomatoes, the film holds a 96% approval rating based on 27 reviews, with an average rating of 7.3/10. The website's critical consensus reads, "Ang Lee's funny and ultimately poignant comedy of manners reveals the filmmaker's skill across genres." Alan Jones of the Radio Times said, "Sharply observed and never once striking a false note, this sweet-and-sour rib-tickler is a real treat." Roger Ebert wrote, "What makes the film work is the underlying validity of the story, the way the filmmakers don’t simply go for melodrama and laughs, but pay these characters their due. At the end of the film, I was a little surprised how much I cared for them."

The worldwide gross of The Wedding Banquet was $23.6 million. The New York Times reported a budget of $750,000. Considering the $1 million budget reported by Variety, the film was also the most financially profitable movie of 1993, when considered in terms of ratios of return, while overall top grosser Jurassic Park only earned a ratio of 13.8 ($914 million earnings on a $60 million budget).

Accolades

Stage adaptations 

In 2003, the Village Theatre presented a musical staging of the story. It was directed by John Tillinger, choreographed by Sergio Trujillo, with music by Woody Pak and book and lyrics by Brian Yorkey. Yorkey, Village's associate artistic director, said this of the production, "The film succeeds because of Ang Lee's delicate poetry, and there is no way we can replicate that or translate that into a musical. So we took the story a step further. Whereas the film ends very ambiguously, our musical goes on past where the film ends". The show starred Welly Yang as Wai Tung.

See also
 Mixed-orientation marriage
 Lavender marriage
 List of submissions to the 66th Academy Awards for Best Foreign Language Film
 List of Taiwanese submissions for the Academy Award for Best Foreign Language Film

References

Further reading

External links
 
 
 
 
 Literature, Arts and Medicine Database, NYU

1993 films
1993 romantic comedy films
1993 LGBT-related films
1993 independent films
American LGBT-related films
American romantic comedy films
American independent films
Central Motion Picture Corporation films
Chinese-language American films
English-language Taiwanese films
Films about interracial romance
Films about weddings
Films directed by Ang Lee
Films produced by James Schamus
Films with screenplays by Ang Lee
Films with screenplays by James Schamus
Films about race and ethnicity
Films set in New York City
Films shot in New York City
Films whose director won the Best Director Golden Horse Award
Films about anti-LGBT sentiment
Gay-related films
Golden Bear winners
Homophobia in fiction
Taiwanese LGBT-related films
Taiwanese romantic comedy films
The Samuel Goldwyn Company films
1990s American films
1990s Mandarin-language films
1990s English-language films
Taiwanese multilingual films
American multilingual films